Tova is a given name, nickname and a surname. Notable people with this name include:

Given name
 Saint Tova of Thorney (died ), Anglo-Saxon martyr
 Tova of the Obotrites (Slavic princess and queen consort of Denmark
 Tova Beck-Friedman (born 1938), American artist, sculptor, writer, filmmaker, and child survivor of the Holocaust 
 Tova Ben-Dov, Israeli Zionist
 Tova Ben Zvi (born 1928), Israeli singer
 Tova Borgnine (1941-2022), Norwegian-born American businesswomman
 Tova Hamilton, Jamaican politician
 Tova Hartman (born 1957), Israeli scholar and social entrepreneur
 Tova Ilan (1929–2019), Israeli educator and politician
 Tova Magnusson (born 1968), Swedish actress and filmmaker
 Tova Milo, Israeli computer scientist
 Tova Mirvis (born 1972), American novelist
 Tova O'Brien (born 1982/1983), New Zealand journalist, host of radio show Tova
 Tova Sanhadray (1906–1993), Israeli politician
 Tova Traesnaes (born 1941), Norwegian-American businesswoman

Surname
 Theresa Tova (born 1955), Canadian actress, singer and playwright

Nickname
 Tosia Altman (1919–1943), Polish courier and smuggler, known as Tova
 Antun Stipančić (1949–1991), Croatian table tennis player

Fictional characters
Tiny Tova, character in The Magic Door
Tova Arrocas, character in Internal Affairs (film)
Tova, character in Critical Role

See also

Toda (surname)
Tola (name)
Toma (name)
Tona (name)
Tora (given name)
Tora (surname)
Tovar (surname)